Pilocrocis cuprealis is a moth in the family Crambidae. It was described by George Hampson in 1912. It is found in Nigeria.

The wingspan is about 34 mm. The wings are uniform dark brown with a bright cupreous gloss.

References

Endemic fauna of Nigeria
Pilocrocis
Moths described in 1912
Moths of Africa